= Tylerton, Virginia =

Unincorporated community in Virginia, US

Coordinates: 38°16′54″N 77°26′04″W

Tylerton is an unincorporated community in Stafford County, in the U.S. state of Virginia.
